Calonotos chalcipleura is a moth of the subfamily Arctiinae. It was described by George Hampson in 1898. It is found in Venezuela.

References

Arctiinae
Moths described in 1898
Arctiinae of South America